Emma E. Amiotte (1913 - 1997) was an Oglala Lakota artist.

Biography 
Amiotte was born in Manderson, SD, April 25, 1913 or 1914. She was the adopted daughter of Maggie Red Bear and the aunt of Arthur Amiotte, also a Lakota artist.

In the 1940s and/or 1950s, she was a live-in housekeeper for the Wilkins family when they lived in the Black Hills Model Home, placed on the National Register of Historic Homes in 2004. She is one of two notable people who lived in the house.

She worked in The Tipi Shop, located in the Sioux Indian Museum, which sold indigenous arts and crafts. Through the shop, Amiotte and other women helped raise funds for the constructions of a new Sioux Indian Museum in 2016.

Amiotte died on August 16, 1997, in Gillette WY, and was buried in Mt. Calvary Cemetery, Rapid City, SD.

Artist 
Amiotte worked as a miniaturist, making replica dolls, tipis, horses, sweat lodges, and scenes of tribal life. She used traditional materials such as quills, feathers, bones, and animal skins in her work. Her dolls are in the permanent collection of the South Dakota Art Museum.

In 1987, Amiotte was inducted into the South Dakota Hall of Fame.

See also 

 Amiotte, E., United States Indian Arts and Crafts Board, & Sioux Indian Museum and Crafts Center. (1973). Miniatures by Emma Amiotte: [an exhibition January 21 to February 17, 1973]. Sioux Indian Museum and Crafts Center.

References 

1913 births
1997 deaths
American women artists
Native American artists
Oglala people
Artists from South Dakota
20th-century Native American women
20th-century Native Americans
20th-century American artists
Native American women artists
People from Oglala Lakota County, South Dakota
20th-century American women artists
Dollmakers